Utyaganovo (Ütägän) is a rural locality (a village) in Amangildinsky Selsoviet, Abzelilovsky District, Bashkortostan, Russia. The population was 447 as of 2010. There are 7 streets.

Geography 
Utyaganovo is located 30 km northwest of Askarovo (the district's administrative centre) by road. Ishkildino is the nearest rural locality.

References 

Rural localities in Abzelilovsky District